Gazza is a genus of marine ray-finned fishes, ponyfishes from the family Leiognathidae which are native to the Indian Ocean and the western Pacific Ocean.

Species
There are currently five recognized species in this genus:
 Gazza achlamys D. S. Jordan & Starks, 1917 (Smalltoothed ponyfish)
 Gazza dentex (Valenciennes in Cuvier & Valenciennes, 1835) (Ovoid toothpony)
 Gazza minuta (Bloch, 1795) (Toothpony)
 Gazza rhombea Kimura, Yamashita & Iwatsuki, 2000 (Rhomboid toothpony)
 Gazza squamiventralis Yamashita & Kimura, 2001 (Scaled belly toothpony)

References

Leiognathidae
Taxa named by Eduard Rüppell
Bioluminescent fish